Miguel Angel Yajure (born May 1, 1998) is a Venezuelan professional baseball pitcher in the San Francisco Giants organization. Yajure signed with the New York Yankees as an international free agent in 2015. He made his MLB debut with the Yankees in 2020, and became the first major-league player to wear number 89, MLB's last unused uniform number. He was traded to the Pittsburgh Pirates before the 2021 season.

Career

New York Yankees
Yajure signed with the New York Yankees as an international free agent in March 2015, receiving $30,000. He made his professional debut that season at 17 years of age  with the Dominican Summer League Yankees, and was 0-2 with a 1.42 ERA with an 0.926 WHIP in 57 innings in 14 starts. He played in 2016 with the Gulf Coast Yankees, and was 1-2 with a 2.87 earned run average (ERA) in 31.1 innings over nine games (six starts).

He missed 2017 after undergoing Tommy John surgery. Yajure returned in 2018 and pitched with the Class A Charleston RiverDogs, for whom he was 4-3 with a 3.90 ERA in 64.2 innings over 14 starts.

Yajure started 2019 with the Class A Tampa Tarpons before being promoted for two starts to the Class AA  Trenton Thunder. Between the two teams, he was 9-6 with a 2.14 ERA (leading all of minor league baseball, minimum 125 innings) in 138.2 innings covering 24 games (20 starts), in which he had 133 strikeouts (2nd among Yankee minor league pitchers). He was 2nd in the Florida State League with 122 strikeouts, 8th in wins, and walked 2.0 batters per 9 innings. After the 2019 season, he was named a 2019 Florida State League Postseason All-Star.  After the season, Baseball America ranked him 11th among Yankees minor leaguers, and as having the best control among all Yankee minor league pitchers. The Yankees placed Yajure on their 40-man roster in November 2019 to protect him from the Rule 5 draft.

Yajure made his major league debut in relief on August 31, 2020, against the Tampa Bay Rays. He pitched three shutout innings, with two strikeouts and three walks. He wore number 89, MLB's last unused uniform number. In three relief appearances with New York in 2020, Yajure compiled a 1.29 ERA while striking out eight batters in seven innings, limited Major League batters to a .130 average.

Pittsburgh Pirates
On January 24, 2021, the Yankees traded Yajure, Roansy Contreras, Maikol Escotto, and Canaan Smith-Njigba to the Pittsburgh Pirates for pitcher Jameson Taillon. On June 24, Yajure was placed on the 60-day injured list with right forearm/elbow soreness. He made four appearances (three starts) for the Pirates during 2021, pitching to an 8.40 ERA and striking out 11 batters in 15 innings. He also appeared in nine games for the Triple-A Indianapolis Indians, compiling a 3.09 ERA and 2–3 record in 43.2 innings over nine starts.

During 2022, Yajure split time between Indianapolis, pitching primarily as a starter and going 4-4 with a 6.09 ERA in 54.2 innings over 16 games (14 starts), and Pittsburgh, pitching primarily as a reliever and going 1-1 with an 8.88 ERA in 24.1 innings over 12 games (one start). In the minors leagues through 2022 he averaged 8.2 hits, 0.5 home runs, 2.4 walks, and 7.9 strikeouts per 9 innings.

He is noted for his control. He has four pitches which include a fastball that occasionally reached 97 mph by 2020, a curveball, a cutter, and a good changeup.

San Francisco Giants
On December 2, 2022, Yajure was claimed off waivers by the San Francisco Giants. On December 13, 2022, Yajure was outrighted to the minors.

References

External links

1998 births
Living people
Charleston RiverDogs players
Dominican Summer League Yankees players
Venezuelan expatriate baseball players in the Dominican Republic
Gulf Coast Yankees players
Major League Baseball pitchers
Major League Baseball players from Venezuela
New York Yankees players
Pittsburgh Pirates players
People from Cabimas
Tampa Tarpons players
Trenton Thunder players
Venezuelan expatriate baseball players in the United States
Indianapolis Indians players
Bradenton Marauders players